Transtillaspis longisetae is a species of moth of the family Tortricidae. It is found in Bolívar Province, Ecuador.

The wingspan is about 16.5 mm.  The ground colour of the forewings is cream, suffused with greyish black and with darker markings. The hindwings are cream mixed with grey.

Etymology
The species name refers to the length of the setae of the sacculus.

References

Moths described in 2008
Transtillaspis
Taxa named by Józef Razowski